|}

This is a list of electoral district results of the 1911 Western Australian election.

Results by Electoral district

Albany 

 Preferences were not distributed.

Avon

Beverley 

 Preferences were not distributed.

Boulder

Brownhill-Ivanhoe

Bunbury

Canning 

 Preferences were not distributed.

Claremont

Collie

Coolgardie

Cue

East Perth

Forrest

Fremantle

Gascoyne

Geraldton

Greenough

Guildford 

 Preferences were not distributed.

Hannans

Irwin

Kalgoorlie

Kanowna

Katanning

Kimberley

Leederville 

 Preferences were not distributed.

Menzies

Moore

Mount Leonora

Mount Magnet

Mount Margaret

Murchison

Murray-Wellington

Nelson

North Perth 

 Preferences were not distributed.

North-East Fremantle 

 Preferences were not distributed.

Northam

Perth

Pilbara

Pingelly

Roebourne 

 Preferences were not distributed.

South Fremantle 

 Preferences were not distributed.

Subiaco

Sussex

Swan

Toodyay

Wagin

West Perth

Williams-Narrogin 

 Preferences were not distributed.

Yilgarn

York

See also 

 1911 Western Australian state election
 Members of the Western Australian Legislative Assembly, 1911–1914

References 

Results of Western Australian elections
1911 elections in Australia